Way Down Yonder is the fourth studio album by American musician Charlie Daniels and the first as the Charlie Daniels Band, originally released in 1974 as a studio album courtesy of Kama Sutra Records. It was re-released in 1977 under the name Whiskey, courtesy of Epic Records.

Review

Whiskey received a two-and-a-half star rating from AllMusic and its review by Jim Worbois says that "a whole album of Daniels's brand of Southern boogie may be a bit much for the average listener but fans will eat it up. This isn't a bad record to listen to but there isn't anything here to recommend either."

Track listing
All songs written by Charlie Daniels.

"I've Been Down" - 3:37
"Give This Fool Another Try" - 8:07
"Low Down Lady" - 4:10
"Land of Opportunity" - 3:02
"Way Down Yonder" - 3:36
"Whiskey" - 5:40
"I'll Always Remember That Song" - 4:24
"Looking for My Mary Jane" - 4:28

Personnel
Charlie Daniels - Audio production, composer, guitar, vocals
Taz DiGregorio - Keyboards, vocals
Barry Barnes - Guitar, vocals
Billy Cox - Bass
Mark Fitzgerald - Bass, vocals
Buddy Davis - Drums
Gary Allen - Drums
Fred Edwards - Drums
Lea Jane Berinati - Vocals

References 

1974 albums
Charlie Daniels albums
Kama Sutra Records albums